Degradome sequencing (Degradome-Seq), also referred to as parallel analysis of RNA ends (PARE), is a modified version of 5'-Rapid Amplification of cDNA Ends (RACE) using high-throughput, deep sequencing methods such as Illumina's SBS technology. Degradome sequencing provides a comprehensive means of analyzing patterns of RNA degradation.

Degradome sequencing has been used to identify microRNA (miRNA) cleavage sites, because miRNAs can cause endonucleolytic cleavage of mRNA by extensive and often perfect complementarity to mRNAs. Degradome sequencing revealed many known and novel plant miRNA (siRNA) targets. Recently, degradome sequencing also has been applied to identify animal (human and mouse) miRNA-derived cleavages.

External links 
 starBase database: a database for exploring microRNA cleavage sites from degradome sequencing (Degradome-Seq) data.

References

RNA
MicroRNA